Rashid Alhassan (born 20 June 2000) is a Ghanaian professional footballer who plays as left-back. He played for the national under-17 team at the 2017 Africa U-17 Cup of Nations and 2017 FIFA U-17 World Cup, placing second in the former.

Club career

Aduana Stars 
Alhassan started his career with Aduana Stars. He made his Ghana Premier League debut during the 2017 Ghana Premier League season. On 25 June 2017, he made his debut, playing the full 90 minutes in a 1–0 against Tema Youth. On 15 October 2017, he scored an equalizer in 57th minute to help Aduana to a 2–1 victory over Elmina Sharks, to help them to win the league with one a game to spare. He featured in 12 league matches and scored 2 goals to eventually help Aduana Stars clinch the league title that season and win the title in his debut season.

He was limited to 12 matches due to being engaged with the Ghana U-17 team within that same period. Based on his performance for both Aduana and the Ghana U-17 team, he was reportedly linked with moves to top flight teams in Germany, Italy, England and USA.

FK Mladá Boleslav 
Alhassan moved to Czech Republic and signed with Czech First League FK Mladá Boleslav in 2019. He was drafted into the teams U-19 side and later to their U-21 side. He was later promoted to the FK Mlada Boleslav B team.

International career

Youth team 
Alhassan featured for the Ghana national under-17 football team in 2017. He was named in the 21 man squad for the 2017 Africa U-17 Cup of Nations. During the first match against Cameroon, he played the full 90 minutes and helped Ghana keep a clean sheet and win by 4–0. At the end he featured in 3 matches, helping Ghana place second and qualify for the 2017 FIFA U-17 World Cup to be hosted by India.

On  21 September 2017, Paa Kwesi Fabin, named him in his 21-man squad ahead of the 2017 FIFA U-17 World Cup along with promising youngsters like Mohammed Kudus, Ibrahim Danlad, Eric Ayiah and Emmanuel Toku. He was one of the highly rated Ghanaian players at the World Cup tournament. He played in all 5 matches as Ghana reached the quarter-final stage and were eliminated by their African counterparts Mali.

Style of play 
Alhassan plays in a left-back position. He combines both defensive and offensive play within a match. He is seen as a hard-working defender who is relentless at closing down on opponents to win back possession and determined to put in the decent tackles. His style of play is put in line with the modern day left-back who can defend, enjoys joining attacks, dribbling and delivering quality crosses. His qualities drew comparisons to top Real Madrid left-back Marcelo.

Honours 
Club

Aduana

 Ghana Premier League: 2017
International

Ghana U-17

 Africa U-17 Cup of Nations runner-up: 2017

References

External links 

2000 births
Living people
Ghanaian footballers
Ghana youth international footballers
Association football defenders
Aduana Stars F.C. players
FK Mladá Boleslav players
Ghana Premier League players
Bohemian Football League players
Ghanaian expatriate footballers
Ghanaian expatriate sportspeople in the Czech Republic
Expatriate footballers in the Czech Republic